The Alphabetic Tower is a 130-meter-high structure in Batumi, Georgia. The tower symbolizes  the uniqueness of the Georgian alphabet and people. The structure combines the design of DNA, in its familiar double helix pattern. Two helix bands rise up the tower holding 33 letters of the Georgian alphabet, each 4 meters tall and made of aluminum.

In the middle of the building is an exposed elevator shaft leading to the very top of the building, in the crown of the structure, where a colossal silver ball is located.

Development
The Alphabetic Tower was built by Spanish company CMD Domingo y Lázaro Ingenieros (Alberto Domingo Cabo and Carlos Lázaro). Construction began on 10 October 2010 with the exterior of the structure completed in December 2011. The building cost $65 million to build.

Structure
The tower is composed of eleven modules of cantilever trusses of steel tubes which make up two bodies, the interior containing the communication core panoramic elevators and stairs, the exterior which supports the whole structure and defines the skin with the big characters.  Each of the 10.8 m. cores is bonded by diaphragms in a star pattern. At the top stands a glass sphere made of triangle elements fixed over steel profiles and sealed. The sphere consists of a hollow circular section structure.

This light space hosts several rooms, distributed on different floors within the sphere.

The first floor is called the transfer floor. It can be reached by the two main panoramic lifts. From the transfer floor you may reach other lifts which serve the other floors.

The second floor hosts a TV studio, next to the kitchen and the restaurant which is on the third floor, designed like a revolving ring. This ring, which goes around 360 degrees in an hour, offers visitors a panoramic view of the city and the Black Sea while they are enjoying their meal. 
The fourth floor has been conceived as an observatory deck, to enjoy the unique views from the Alphabetic Tower. This floor leads to the fifth one, which is designed to allow visitors see how the tuned mass damper works. The tuned mass damper is a fifty-ton device mounted in structures to reduce the amplitude of mechanical vibrations.

Current condition
Since the building was constructed it has virtually remained forsaken. As of 2014, it was known that the elevator was out of order and hundreds of dead birds could be found on the floors, though the building itself was still electrified and looked comparably new. In May 2015 Batumi City Hall decided to lease the 130m-tall Alphabet Tower to an unnamed Spanish company for the next 20 years. Batumi City Hall used to spend 700,000 GEL per year on the tower's maintenance. As of 2017, the restaurant is open for visitors.

External links
 Documentary by CMD Ingenieros

References

Georgian Black Sea coast
Buildings and structures in Batumi
Georgian scripts
Towers in Georgia (country)
Skyscrapers in Georgia (country)
Towers completed in 2011
Novelty buildings in Georgia (country)